Simon J. "Bobby" Engram III (born January 7, 1973) is an American football coach and former wide receiver. He is the wide receivers coach for the Washington Commanders of the National Football League (NFL). Engram played college football at Penn State and was drafted by the Chicago Bears in the second round of the 1996 NFL Draft. Engram also played for the Seattle Seahawks and Kansas City Chiefs before becoming a coach by the 2010s.

Early years
Engram was born on January 7, 1973, in Camden, South Carolina. He attended Camden High School, where he was a three-time All-State selection at wide receiver. In 1991, Engram's father died in an automobile accident.

College career
As a college junior, Engram was the go-to receiver on Penn State's undefeated 1994 team. He garnered All-American honors and won the inaugual Biletnikoff Award, recognizing the nation's best wide receiver. Engram was the Nittany Lions' career receptions leader until 2008. He is still the all-time leader in yards and touchdowns with 3,026 yards and 31 touchdowns. He also racked up 786 career punt return yards for the Nittany Lions, ranking him second in school history. He graduated in 1995 with a Bachelor of Science degree in exercise science.

Professional career

Chicago Bears
Engram was drafted in the 2nd round of the 1996 NFL Draft, 52nd overall to the Chicago Bears. In his rookie season, he had 33 receptions for 389 yards and 6 touchdown catches. He also returned kicks. In 1999, he had his first 10-reception game in week 15 with 10 receptions for 94 yards and a touchdown, following this with a franchise-record 13 receptions 143 yards and two touchdowns. The following season, he had just 16 receptions in three games before injury ended his 5 seasons with the Bears.

Seattle Seahawks
Engram signed with the Seattle Seahawks before the 2001 season. He would spend 8 seasons with the Seahawks and reached the 1,000-yard receiving threshold in 2007 (94 catches, 1,147 yards), which was the only 1,000-yard season of his career.

Despite being a starter in only 67 of the 109 games he played with Seattle, Engram ranks fifth in franchise history in receptions (399) and fourth in receiving yards (4,859). His 94 receptions in 2007 was a Seahawks single-season record (since surpassed by Tyler Lockett), and he led the team in catches during the team's Super Bowl XL season in 2005 with 67.

Engram was named to the Seahawks' 35th Anniversary Team in May 2011.

Kansas City Chiefs
Engram joined the Kansas City Chiefs in 2009, but only played in 5 games for the team.

Cleveland Browns
Engram signed with the Cleveland Browns in the 2010 preseason, but failed to make the roster and was released before the regular season began.

Retirement 
On January 28, 2011, Engram announced his retirement from playing.

Professional coaching career

San Francisco 49ers
The same day, Engram announced his retirement, he also accepted a job as an offensive assistant coach for the San Francisco 49ers.

Pittsburgh Panthers
In 2012, it was announced that Engram would become the wide receivers coach for the Pittsburgh Panthers.

Baltimore Ravens
On February 6, 2014, the Baltimore Ravens announced Engram as their new wide receivers coach. On January 11, 2018, the Ravens announced his job switch as their tight ends coach.

Wisconsin Badgers
Engram was the offensive coordinator for the Wisconsin Badgers during the 2022 season.

Washington Commanders
Engram was hired as the wide receivers coach for the Washington Commanders on March 9, 2023.

Personal life
Engram and his wife Deanna have four children, one of whom died from sickle-cell disease in 2018. In 2006, Engram was diagnosed with Graves-Basedow disease, which caused him to miss playing time during the season.

References

External links
Washington Commanders bio

1973 births
Living people
Baltimore Ravens coaches
Pittsburgh Panthers football coaches
Players of American football from South Carolina
People from Westmoreland County, Pennsylvania
Players of American football from Pennsylvania
American football wide receivers
Penn State Nittany Lions football players
Chicago Bears players
Seattle Seahawks players
Kansas City Chiefs players
Cleveland Browns players
San Francisco 49ers coaches
Penn State Nittany Lions football coaches
Ed Block Courage Award recipients
Wisconsin Badgers football coaches
Brian Piccolo Award winners
Washington Commanders coaches